MVS Radio are a group of four international Spanish-language radio networks owned by the mass media conglomerate MVS Comunicaciones. The group of radio networks consists of Exa FM, La Mejor, FM Globo and MVS Noticias and are broadcast in a various Latin American countries including Argentina, Costa Rica, Dominic Republic, Ecuador, El Salvador, Guatemala, Honduras, Mexico and the United States.

Exa FM 
Exa FM is an international network radio format of MVS Radio in Spanish-language Top 40 outlets broadcasting throughout Mexico, Guatemala, Honduras, Costa Rica, El Salvador, Ecuador and Dominican Republic.

Stations covering Exa FM include:

Mexico 
 XHVW-FM 90.5 MHz - Acámbaro, Guanajuato
 XHNQ-FM 99.3 MHz - Acapulco, Guerrero
 XHAGC-FM 97.3 MHz - Aguascalientes, Aguascalientes
 XHMI-FM 100.3 MHz - Campeche, Campeche
 XHZN-FM 104.5 MHz / XEZN-AM 780 kHz -  Celaya, Guanajuato
 XHLO-FM 100.9 MHz - Chihuahua, Chihuahua
 XHDH-FM 91.5 MHz - Ciudad Acuña, Coahuila
 XHIT-FM 99.7 MHz / XEIT-AM 1070 kHz - Ciudad del Carmen, Campeche
 XHPX-FM 98.3 MHz - Ciudad Juárez, Chihuahua for El Paso
 XHRLM-FM 91.9 MHz - Ciudad Mante, Tamaulipas
 XHOX-FM 99.3 MHz - Ciudad Obregón, Sonora
 XHBJ-FM 94.5 MHz - Ciudad Victoria, Tamaulipas
 XHCTS-FM 95.7 MHz - Comitán, Chiapas
 XHCOC-FM 99.7 MHz - Colima, Colima
 XHPT-FM 91.3 MHz - Córdoba Veracruz
 XHCT-FM 95.7 MHz - Cuernavaca, Morelos
 XHESA-FM 101.7 MHz - Culiacán, Sinaloa
 XHCAV-FM 101.3 MHz - Durango, Durango
 XHADA-FM 104.1 MHz - Ensenada, Baja California
 XHFRE-FM 100.5 MHz - Fresnillo, Zacatecas
 XHMA-FM 101.1 MHz - Guadalajara, Jalisco
 XHGSE-FM 98.1 MHz - Guasave, Sinaloa
 XHNY-FM 93.5 MHz - Irapuato, Guanajuato
 XHLP-FM 89.9 MHz - La Piedad, Michoacán
 XHMD-FM 104.1 MHz - León, Guanajuato
 XHCCAC-FM 103.9 MHz - Los Cabos, Baja California Sur
 XHMPM-FM 98.9 MHz - Los Mochis, Sinaloa
 XHOPE-FM 89.7 MHz - Mazatlán, Sinaloa
 XHMRA-FM 99.3 MHz - Mérida, Yucatán
 XHJC-FM 91.5 MHz - Mexicali, Baja California
 XHEXA-FM 104.9 MHz - Mexico City
 XHWGR-FM 101.1 MHz / XEWGR-AM 780 kHz - Monclova, Coahuila
 XHSR-FM 97.3 MHz - Monterrey, Nuevo León
 XHKW-FM 89.3 MHz - Morelia, Michoacán
 XHQT-FM 102.7 MHz - Nogales, Sonora
 XHBK-FM 95.7 MHz / XEBK-AM 1340 kHz - Nuevo Laredo, Tamaulipas
 XHNR-FM 98.5 MHz - Oaxaca, Oaxaca
 XHPNS-FM 107.1 MHz- Piedras Negras, Coahuila
 XHRIC-FM 101.9 MHz - Poza Rica, Veracruz
 XHJE-FM 94.1 MHz - Puebla, Puebla
 XHOE-FM 95.5 MHz - Querétaro, Querétaro
 XHVI-FM 99.1 MHz - San Juan del Río, Querétaro
 XHESL-FM 102.1 MHz - San Luis Potosí, San Luis Potosí
 XHOX-FM 95.3 MHz - Tampico, Tamaulipas
 XHTAC-FM 91.5 MHz / XETAC-AM 1000 kHz - Tapachula, Chiapas
 XHTXO-FM 92.9 MHz - Taxco, Guerrero
 XHWJ-FM 102.9 MHz - Tehuacán, Puebla
 XHGLX-FM 91.7 MHz - Tijuana, Baja California
 XHMP-FM 95.5 MHz - Torreón, Coahuila
 XHPTUX-FM 101.3 MHz - Tuxtepec, Oaxaca
 XHCQ-FM 98.5 MHz - Tuxtla Gutiérrez, Chiapas
 XHPS-FM 93.3 MHz - Veracruz, Veracruz
 XHKV-FM 88.5 MHz / XEKV-AM 740 kHz - Villahermosa, Tabasco
 XHPZAM-FM 98.1 MHz - Zamora, Michoacán

Costa Rica 
 102.7 MHz - San José, Costa Rica

Dominican Republic 
 HIK52 96.9 MHz - Santo Domingo

Ecuador 
 92.5 MHz - Quito
 89.7 MHz - Riobamba
 93.9 MHz - Ibarra
 90.1 Mhz - Tulcán

El Salvador 
 91.3 MHz - San Salvador

Guatemala 
 90.7 MHz - Escuintla
 101.7 MHz - Guatemala City
 97.9 MHz - Izabal
 106.3 MHz - Jutiapa
 102.3 MHz - Oriente
 97.1 MHz - Quetzaltenango
 97.5 MHz - Sur Occidente
 102.3 MHz - Zacapa

Honduras 
 93.9 MHz - Atlantic Zone
 100.5 MHz - Central Zone
 89.3 MHz - North Zone
 95.9 MHz - South Zone

Former Stations

Mexico 
 XHNNO-FM 99.9 MHz - Agua Prieta, Sonora
 XHWO-FM 97.7 MHz / XEWO-AM 1020 kHz - Chetumal, Quintana Roo
 XHQAA-FM 99.3 MHz / XEQAA-AM 560 kHz - Chetumal, Quintana Roo
 XHRG-FM 95.5 MHz - Ciudad Acuña, Coahuila
 XHTD-FM 101.7 MHz - Coatzacoalcos, Veracruz
 XHBH-FM 98.5 MHz / XEBH-AM 590 kHz - Hermosillo, Sonora
 XHAH-FM 90.1 MHz - Juchitán, Oaxaca
 XHMLS-FM 91.3 MHz - Matamoros, Tamaulipas
 XHRV-FM 89.5 MHz - Matamoros, Tamaulipas
 XHMRL-FM 91.5 MHz - Morelia, Michoacán
 XHPCA-FM 106.1 MHz - Pachuca, Hidalgo
 XHRE-FM 105.5 MHz - Piedras Negras, Coahuila
 XHPBA-FM 98.7 MHz - Puebla, Puebla
 XHCJX-FM 99.9 MHz - Puerto Vallarta, Jalisco
 XHOZ-FM 94.7 MHz - Querétaro, Querétaro
 XHRR-FM 102.5 MHz - Reynosa, Tamaulipas
 XHRP-FM 94.7 MHz - Saltillo, Coahuila
 XHMIG-FM 105.9 MHz - San Miguel de Allende, Guanajuato
 XHOD-FM 96.9 MHz - San Luis Potosí, San Luis Potosí
 XHTE-FM 99.9 MHz - Tehuacán, Puebla
 XHUH-FM 96.9 MHz / XEUH-AM 1320 kHz - Tuxtepec, Oaxaca
 XHUF-FM 100.5 MHz / XEUF-AM 610 kHz - Uruapan, Michoacán
 XHWA-FM 98.5 MHz - Xalapa, Veracruz

Panama 
 88.5 MHz - Panama, Panama

United States 
 KDRX 106.9 MHz - Del Rio, Texas
 KEXA 93.9 MHz - King City, California
 KXLI 94.5 MHz - Las Vegas, Nevada
 KRGX 95.1 MHz - Rio Grande City, Texas
 KYZZ 97.9 MHz - Salinas, California
 87.7 MHz - Uvalde, Texas

La Mejor 
La Mejor is a network radio format of MVS Radio in Regional Mexican outlets broadcasting throughout the Mexico and portions of Costa Rica and the United States.
Stations covering La Mejor FM include:

Mexico 

 XHAK-FM  89.7 MHz - Acámbaro, Guanajuato
 XHSE-FM 100.1 MHz - Acapulco, Guerrero
 XHAGT-FM 93.7 MHz - Aguascalientes, Aguascalientes
 XHEFG-FM 89.1 MHz - Celaya, Guanajuato
 XHHAC-FM 100.7 MHz - Ciudad Acuña, Coahuila
 XHBCC-FM 100.5 MHz / XEBCC-AM 1030 kHz - Ciudad del Carmen, Campeche
 XHRAW-FM 93.9 MHz - Ciudad Miguel Alemán, Tamaulipas
 XHVJS-FM 103.3 MHz - Ciudad Obregón, Sonora
 XHUU-FM 92.5 MHz / XEUU-AM 1080 kHz - Colima, Colima
 XHPG-FM 92.1 MHz - Córdoba, Veracruz
 XHVZ-FM 97.3 MHz - Cuernavaca, Morelos
 XHECQ-FM 104.1 MHz - Culiacán, Sinaloa
 XHDGO-FM 103.7 MHz / XEDGO-AM 760 kHz - Durango, Durango
 XHENA-FM 103.3 MHz - Ensenada, Baja California
 XHPFCP-FM 95.1 MHz - Felipe Carrillo Puerto, Quintana Roo
 XHEMA-FM 107.9 MHz / XEMA-AM 690 kHz - Fresnillo, Zacatecas
 XHRO-FM 95.5 MHz - Guadalajara, Jalisco
 XHBH-FM 98.5 MHz - Hermosillo, Sonora
 XHOU-FM 105.3 MHz - Huajuapan de León, Oaxaca
 XHSO-FM 99.9 MHz - León, Guanajuato
 XHHS-FM 90.9 MHz - / XEHS-AM 540 kHz - Los Mochis, Sinaloa
 XHECS-FM 96.1 MHz - Manzanillo, Colima
 XHHW-FM 102.7 MHz / XEHW-AM 600 kHz - Mazatlán, Sinaloa
 XHQW-FM 90.1 MHz - Mérida, Yucatán
 XHVG-FM 103.3 MHz - Mexicali, Baja California
 XERC-FM 97.7 MHz - Mexico City
 XHEMF-FM 96.3 MHz - Monclova, Coahuila
 XHSRO-FM 92.5 MHz - Monterrey, Nuevo León
 XHNGS-FM 96.7 MHz - Nogales, Sonora
 XHZB-FM 101.7 MHz - Oaxaca, Oaxaca
 XHSL-FM 99.1 MHz - Piedras Negras, Coahuila
 XHPW-FM 94.7 MHz - Poza Rica, Veracruz
 XHEDO-FM 94.1 MHz - Puerto Escondido, Oaxaca
 XHCJX-FM 99.9 MHz - Puerto Vallarta, Jalisco
 XHXE-FM 92.7 MHz - Querétaro, Querétaro
 XEFD-AM 590 kHz - Reynosa, Tamaulipas
 XHSHT-FM 102.5 MHz - Saltillo, Coahuila
 XHGX-FM 92.5 MHz - San Luis de la Paz, Guanajuato
 XHWZ-FM 90.9 MHz - San Luis Potosí, San Luis Potosí
 XHJT-FM 100.1 MHz - Tampico, Tamaulipas
 XHGY-FM 100.7 MHz - Tehuacán, Puebla
 XHTIM-FM 90.7 MHz - Tijuana, Baja California
 XHPE-FM 97.1 MHz - Torreón, Coahuila
 XHXP-FM 106.5 MHz - Tuxtepec, Oaxaca
 XHVE-FM 100.5 MHz - Veracruz, Veracruz

Costa Rica 
 TIAAC FM 99.1 MHz - San José, Costa Rica

United States 
 KMHR 950 AM - Boise, Idaho
 KCOT 96.3 MHz - Cotulla, Texas
 WWFL 1340 kHz - Clermont, Florida
 KSUN 1400 kHz - Phoenix, Arizona
 KEWP 103.5 MHz - Uvalde Estates, Texas

Former stations

Mexico 
 XHJY-FM 101.5 MHz - Autlán, Jalisco
 XHEZ-FM 90.7 MHz / XEEZ-AM 970 kHz - Caborca, Sonora
 XEOF-AM 740 kHz - Celaya, Guanajuato
 XHRG-FM 95.5 MHz - Ciudad Acuña, Coahuila
 XHPMOC-FM 104.9 MHz - Ciudad Cuauhtémoc, Chihuahua
 XHLAZ-FM 93.5 MHz - Ciudad Guzmán, Jalisco
 XHLUP-FM 89.1 MHz / XELUP-AM 1130 kHz - Compostela, Nayarit
 XHAG-FM 102.1 MHz - Córdoba, Veracruz
 XESA-AM 1260 kHz - Culiacán, Sinaloa
 XEHQ-AM 920 kHz - Hermosillo, Sonora
 XERJ-AM 1320 kHz - Mazatlán, Sinaloa
 XERRF-AM 860 kHz - Mérida, Yucatán
 XHYW-FM 106.7 MHz / XEYW-AM 760 kHz - Mérida, Yucatán
 XHCMS-FM 105.5 MHz - Mexicali, Baja California
 XHMVS-FM 102.5 MHz - Mexico City
 XEOC-AM 560 kHz - Mexico City
 XHMSN-FM 100.1 MHz - Montemorelos, Nuevo León
 XEZT-AM 1250 kHz - Puebla, Puebla
 XECJU-AM 590 kHz - Puerto Vallarta, Jalisco
 XHPM-FM 100.1 MHz - San Luis Potosí, San Luis Potosí
 XHSI-FM 94.5 MHz / XESI-AM 1240 kHz - Santiago Ixcuintla, Nayarit
 XHPTCS-FM 95.5 MHz - Tapachula, Chiapas
 XHHTY-FM 107.1 MHz - Tlapacoyan, Veracruz
 XHOCL-FM 99.3 MHz - Tijuana, Baja California for San Diego, California
 XHVV-FM 101.7 MHz - Tuxtla Gutiérrez, Chiapas
 XHMET-FM 91.9 MHz / XEMET-AM 570 kHz - Valladolid, Yucatán
 XHLI-FM 98.3 MHz - Villahermosa, Tabasco
 XHZHO-FM 98.5 MHz - Zihuatanejo, Guerrero

Ecuador 
 HCRA FM 103.9 MHz - Ibarra

El Salvador 
 YSTN FM 98.9 MHz - San Salvador

United States 
 KADD 93.5 MHz - Las Vegas, Nevada
 WBZQ 1300 kHz - Huntington, Indiana
 KGDL 92.1 MHz - Trent, Texas
 KNNR 1400 kHz - Reno, Nevada
 KZAM 98.7 MHz - Pleasant Valley, Texas

FM Globo 

Radio station broadcasting romantic ballads and pop in Spanish.

Stations include:

Mexico 
 XHPL-FM 99.7 MHz - Ciudad Acuña, Coahuila
 XHMAB-FM 101.3 MHz / XEMAB-AM 950 kHz - Ciudad del Carmen, Campeche
 XHAG-FM 102.1 MHz - Córdoba, Veracruz
 XHLC-FM 98.7 MHz - Guadalajara, Jalisco
 XHMMS-FM 97.9 MHz - Mazatlán, Sinaloa
 XHPF-FM 101.9 MHz - Mexicali, Baja California
 XHJM-FM 88.1 MHz - Monterrey, Nuevo León
 XHVUC-FM 95.9 MHz - Piedras Negras, Coahuila
 XHPR-FM 102.7 MHz / XEPR-AM 1020 kHz - Poza Rica, Veracruz
 XHOCL-FM 99.3 MHz - Tijuana, Baja California
 XHUH-FM 96.9 MHz - Tuxtepec, Oaxaca
 XHZHO-FM 98.5 MHz - Zihuatanejo, Guerrero

Costa Rica 
 100.3 MHz - San José, Costa Rica

Former stations

Mexico 
 XHNQ-FM 99.3 MHz - Acapulco, Guerrero
 XHAGC-FM 97.3 MHz - Aguascalientes, Aguascalientes
 XHLTZ-FM 106.1 MHz - Aguascalientes, Aguascalientes
 XHPX-FM 98.3 MHz - Ciudad Juárez, Chihuahua
 XHCT-FM 95.7 MHz - Cuernavaca, Morelos
 XHSC-FM 93.9 MHz - Guadalajara, Jalisco
 XEHQ-AM 590 kHz - Hermosillo, Sonora
 XEHQ-AM 920 kHz - Hermosillo, Sonora
 XHMD-FM 104.1 MHz - León, Guanajuato
 XEOY-FM 89.7 MHz - Mexico City
 XHMRD-FM 104.9 MHz - Mexico City
 XHSR-FM 97.3 MHz - Monterrey, Nuevo León
 XHNGS-FM 96.7 MHz - Nogales, Sonora
 XHARE-FM 97.7 MHz - Ojinaga, Chihuahua
 XHMJ-FM 97.9 MHz / XEMJ-AM 920 kHz - Piedras Negras, Coahuila
 XHRR-FM 102.5 MHz - Reynosa, Tamaulipas
 XHOD-FM 96.9 MHz - San Luis Potosí, San Luis Potosí
 XHPM-FM 100.1 MHz - San Luis Potosí, San Luis Potosí
 XHPS-FM 93.3 MHz - Veracruz, Veracruz

Stereorey 

A station broadcasting English-language music from the 1950s to the 2000s. Stereorey (Argentina) follows however the format of songs from the 1960s to the present, with American Hot Adult Contemporary music.

Stations broadcasting Stereorey include:

Mexico 
 XHCAA-FM 100.9 MHz - Aguascalientes, Aguascalientes

Argentina 
 102.7 MHz - Misiones, Argentina

Former stations

Mexico 
 XHSE-FM 100.1 MHz - Acapulco, Guerrero
 XHAGT-FM 93.7 MHz - Aguascalientes, Aguascalientes
 XHEOF-FM 101.9 MHz - Celaya, Guanajuato
 XHTO-FM 104.3 MHz – Ciudad Juárez, Chihuahua
 XHPX-FM 98.3 MHz – Ciudad Juárez, Chihuahua
 XHVZ-FM 97.3 MHz - Cuernavaca, Morelos
 XHADA-FM 106.9 MHz - Ensenada, Baja California
 XHRO-FM 95.5 MHz - Guadalajara, Jalisco
 XHBH-FM 98.5 MHz / XEBH-AM 590 kHz - Hermosillo, Sonora
 XHSO-FM 99.9 MHz - León Guanajuato
 XHVG-FM 103.3 MHz - Mexicali, Baja California
 XHV-FM/XHMVS-FM 102.5 MHz - Mexico City
 XHSRO-FM 92.5 MHz - Monterrey, Nuevo León
 XHQT-FM 102.7 MHz - Nogales, Sonora
 XHRIC-FM 101.9 MHz - Poza Rica, Veracruz
 XHZM-FM 92.5 MHz - Puebla, Puebla
 XHCJX-FM 99.9 MHz - Puerto Vallarta, Jalisco
 XHPM-FM 100.1 MHz - San Luis Potosí, San Luis Potosí
 XHJT-FM 100.1 MHz - Tampico, Tamaulipas
 XHGLX-FM 91.7 MHz - Tijuana, Baja California
 XHVE-FM 100.5 MHz - Veracruz, Veracruz
 XEVT-AM 970 kHz - Villahermosa, Tabasco

Best FM 

Radio station based on 1980s, 1990s music up to the present.

Stations include:

Costa Rica 
 TIHBG FM 103.5 MHz - San José, Costa Rica

Former stations

Mexico 
 XHSE-FM 100.1 MHz - Acapulco, Guerrero
 XHAGT-FM 93.7 MHz - Aguascalientes, Aguascalientes
 XHVZ-FM 97.3 MHz - Cuernavaca, Morelos
 XHADA-FM 106.9 MHz - Ensenada, Baja California
 XHRO-FM 95.5 MHz - Guadalajara, Jalisco
 XHSO-FM 99.9 MHz - León, Guanajuato
 XHVG-FM 103.3 MHz - Mexicali, Baja California
 XHMVS-FM 102.5 MHz - Mexico City
 XHSRO-FM 92.5 MHz - Monterrey, Nuevo León
 XHPM-FM 100.1 MHz - San Luis Potosí, San Luis Potosí
 XHJT-FM 100.1 MHz - Tampico, Tamaulipas
 XHVE-FM 100.5 MHz - Veracruz, Veracruz

External links 
 MVS Radio official site
 Exa FM
 List of Exa FM affiliates
 La Mejor
 FM Globo
 Cadena Stereorey Argentina
 Stereorey Luis Potosi, Mexico
 Mi Radio, El Salvador

 
Mexican radio networks
MVS Comunicaciones